Templecombe is a village in Somerset, England, situated on the A357 road five miles south of Wincanton,  east of Yeovil, and  west of Salisbury. The village has a population of 1,560. Along with the hamlet of Combe Throop, it forms the parish of Abbas and Templecombe.

History
Prior to the Norman Conquest Combe was held by Leofwine Godwinson.

One part of the village was known as Abbas Combe which was recorded in the Domesday Book of 1086–7 as Cumbe, when it was held by the church of St Edward, Shaftesbury.

The other manor within the parish was held by Godwinson, but after the Norman Conquest, was given to Bishop Odo of Bayeux. It was his descendant Serlo FitzOdo who granted it to the Knights Templar.

The parish was part of the Hundred of Horethorne.

Templecombe derives its name from Combe Templariorum, after the Knights Templar who established Templecombe Preceptory in the village in 1185. After they were suppressed in 1312 it was granted to the Knights Hospitaller who held it until the dissolution of the monasteries, after which it was acquired by Richard Duke (d. 1572) of Otterton, Devon. An attempt to discover 'the village of the templars' was made by the Time Team television series, in a programme first shown in 1996.

The Manor House in the high street was built in the 17th century on the site of a medieval building. Richard Boyle, 1st Earl of Cork bought Temple Coombe Manor in 1637 for £20,000. The Earl already owned Stalbridge Manor in Dorset, close by. Boyle also purchased Annery House near Bideford in 1640 for £5000.

Somerset by G.W. Wade and J.H. Wade states, "Templecombe (or Abbas Combe), an inconsiderable village at the S.E. extremity of the county, with an important station on the S. & D. and L. & S.W. lines. The church is ancient but uninteresting, and seems to have been considerably altered. It contains a curious E.E. font. The tower is somewhat peculiar, and forms the S. porch. On the rising ground at the S. of the village are the remains of a preceptory of the Knights Templars, founded in the 12th century by Serlo Fitz-Odo. From this foundation the place takes its name. A long building, which was perhaps once the refectory, but which is now used as a barn, will be noticed abutting on a farm-house along the road to Milborne Port. In an orchard at the back of the farm are the ruins of a small chapel."

Governance
The Abbas and Templecombe parish council has responsibility for local issues, including setting an annual precept (local rate) to cover the council's operating costs and producing annual accounts for public scrutiny. The parish council evaluates local planning applications and works with the local police, district council officers, and neighbourhood watch groups on matters of crime, security, and traffic. The parish council's role also includes initiating projects for the maintenance and repair of parish facilities, as well as consulting with the district council on the maintenance, repair, and improvement of highways, drainage, footpaths, public transport, and street cleaning. Conservation matters (including trees and listed buildings) and environmental issues are also the responsibility of the council.

The village falls within the non-metropolitan district of South Somerset, and the area of Somerset County Council. The village is part of the 'Blackmoor Vale' electoral ward for council elections, along with several neighbouring villages. It is also part of the Somerton and Frome constituency in the House of Commons. Historically it was part of Wincanton Rural District, before local government reorganisation in 1974.

Transport
The railway station is served by trains on the London Waterloo to Exeter St Davids West of England Main Line, originally built by the London and South Western Railway. When the village was served by the Somerset and Dorset Joint Railway, trains had to reverse into Templecombe station. This unusual characteristic was shared with Limerick Junction in County Tipperary in Ireland, and also previously with Dorchester South. The station closed in 1966 due to the Beeching Axe, but re-opened due to local pressure in 1983.

Economy
Templecombe's largest employer is Thales Underwater Systems.

Religious sites
The parish Church of St. Mary dates from the 12th century, but was largely rebuilt in the 19th century. It has been designated as a Grade II* listed building. The church contains a panel painting discovered in a local cottage which has been carbon dated to around 1280 which is believed to be linked to the period when the Knights Templar held the village.

In Templecombe stands the United Reformed Church (next door to the former The Royal Wessex, Public House). This building has been on the site for over 150 years and was originally a congregational church.

Notable residents
General Sir Richard McCreery (1898–1967), Chief of Staff to Field Marshal Harold Alexander, 1st Earl Alexander of Tunis, at the time of the Second Battle of El Alamein and later commanded the British Eighth Army in Northern Italy during 1944–45, died in Templecombe.

References

External links

Village website

Villages in South Somerset